Musnad al-Bazzar, is one of the Hadith book written by Hafiz Abu Bakr Ahmed al-Bazzar (d. 292 AH) in the third century of Islamic History.

Description
The book contains three hundred & twenty seven (327) hadiths according to Maktaba Shamila. The books contain both Authentic and weak narrations.

Publications
The book has been published by many organizations around the world: 
   Musnad al-Bazzar  by Hafiz Abu Bakr Ahmed al-Bazzar: Published:  al-Risalah al-'Alamiyyah | Damascus/Beirur, Syria/Lebanon
   Musnad al-Bazzar (مسند البزار - الجزء الثامن عشر‬) (Arabic Edition)
   Musnad al-Bazzar 1/15 (مـسـنـد الـبـزار)  by Hafiz Abu Bakr Ahmed al-Bazzar: Published:   DKI, Beirut

See also
 List of Sunni books
 Kutub al-Sittah
 Sahih Muslim
 Jami al-Tirmidhi
 Sunan Abu Dawood
 Jami' at-Tirmidhi
 Either: Sunan ibn Majah, Muwatta Malik

References

9th-century Arabic books
10th-century Arabic books
Sunni literature
Hadith
Hadith collections
Sunni hadith collections